Richard Francis Evelyn Walsh (born 8 December 1952) is an English actor, best known for playing fireman Bert "Sicknote" Quigley in the long-running ITV drama series London's Burning from 1986 to 2000. He has also appeared in other well-known British television shows, including Midsomer Murders, Doctors and Heartbeat. He was born in Lewisham, London, and is married to fellow actress Sarah Keller. They have one son, named James.

External links

1952 births
Living people
English male television actors
People from Lewisham
Male actors from London
20th-century English male actors
21st-century English male actors